Mem is a Semitic letter. 

Mem or MEM may also refer to:

Business and organizations
 Missouri Employers Mutual, a workers' compensation insurance company
 Mondpaca Esperantista Movado, an Esperanto association
 The Main Event Mafia, an American professional wrestling stable

People
 Mem (given name), including a list of people with the name or nickname

Places
 Mem Castle, in Sweden
 Memphis International Airport, in U.S., IATA airport code MEM

Science and technology
 2,5-Dimethoxy-4-ethoxyamphetamine (MEM), a psychedelic drug 
 2-Methoxyethoxymethyl (MEM), an alcohol protecting group
 Mars Excursion Module, a 1960s proposed spacecraft 
 Eagle's minimal essential medium, a synthetic cell culture medium
 Monocular estimate method, a form of dynamic retinoscopy 
 Mem (computing), a measurement unit for the number of memory accesses
 Mem (command), a DOS command

Other uses
 Master of Engineering Management, an academic degree
 Master of Environmental Management, an academic degree

See also
 
 Meme
 Mems (disambiguation)
 Memory (disambiguation)
 Mem and Zin, a Kurdish classic love story